This is a list of caves located in Estonia.

References

 
Estonia
Caves